Darwin W. Thomas (September 5, 1894 – November 22, 1954) was born in Malad City, Idaho on September 5, 1894. He was the oldest child of David Morgan Thomas and Sarah Jane Williams Thomas. His early education through high school was in Malad City.

After graduation from Malad High School, Thomas attended the former Boise Normal School and then was a teacher for several years in St. John and Elkhorn in Oneida County and in Dayton in Franklin County. He entered the University of Idaho Law School in 1921 and graduated four years later.

Thomas served as the Oneida County prosecuting attorney for six years, Malad City Attorney for four years and Assistant Attorney General for Idaho for five years. He moved with his family from Malad to Boise in 1935 after that appointment. He was later an attorney for the Office of Price Administration and entered private practice with Eugene Anderson, a Boise attorney, about 1945.

Thomas was the first native-born Idahoan to serve on the Idaho Supreme Court. He was elected to the court in 1950 to a six-year term and served from January 1, 1951 until his death on November 22, 1954. He was married to Zilla Lewis, also a native of Malad City. He is buried in the Malad City cemetery.

References

1954 deaths
1894 births
Idaho Democrats
20th-century American judges
People from Malad City, Idaho